Murder Over New York is a 1940 American mystery film directed by Harry Lachman and starring Sidney Toler as Charlie Chan. The cast also features Marjorie Weaver, Robert Lowery and Ricardo Cortez. Chan must solve a murder mystery while attending a police convention. Shemp Howard plays "Shorty McCoy" in an uncredited appearance.

Plot
On a flight to New York for an annual police convention, Chan encounters his old Scotland Yard friend, Hugh Drake (Frederick Worlock). Drake is now a member of military intelligence trying to track down what he believes is a sabotage ring led by a Paul Narvo. A bomber and its pilots crashed the day before. Chan offers his assistance.

Chan is welcomed at the airport by New York Police Inspector Vance (Donald McBride) and, to Chan's surprise, his number two son Jimmy Chan (Sen Yung).

Chan goes to see Drake the next day at the apartment of George Kirby (Ricardo Cortez), where a dinner party is in progress. He finds his friend dead of poison gas in Drake's library, where he had gone to do some work. Drake's briefcase, containing all the information he had gathered about the sabotage ring, is missing. The window is latched, so Chan concludes one of the guests is responsible. Chan discovers that Drake asked that his Oxford classmate Herbert Fenton (Melville Cooper), actress June Preston and Ralph Percy, chief designer at the Metropolitan Aircraft Corporation, be invited to the party. Kirby himself is the company president. The lost bomber crashed at the company's plant. Also present is stockbroker Keith Jeffery (John Sutton). A servant (Clarence Muse) reports chemist David Elliot (Robert Lowery) insisted on seeing Drake, so he showed him in.

Chan learns that Preston also spoke with Drake that night, on behalf of a friend, Patricia West (Marjorie Weaver). West, it turns out, married Narvo in India. When she found out Narvo was involved in sabotage, she fled, only to be pursued by her husband and his assistant, Ramullah.

Ramullah is eventually tracked down, with West's help, and taken into custody. (During a police lineup of Indians, Shorty McCoy, aka "The Canarsie Kid", [Shemp Howard] is revealed to be a faker, not a fakir.) Before Ramullah can be questioned, however, he is shot and killed. West narrowly avoids the same fate.

A coatroom attendant shows up and states Drake checked his briefcase at the club where he works. Chan and Vance wait to see who will claim it. It is Boggs, Kirby's butler. He claims that Kirby left him a note instructing him to get the briefcase. Upon close inspection, Chan concludes it is a forgery. He then discovers Kirby's body.

Chan decides to gather all the suspects at the airport the next day. The airplane, rigged the night before to release poison gas when it dives, takes off for a test flight with nearly everyone aboard. As the bomber starts to descend, Fenton grabs the falling glass globe containing the gas. When they land, he smashes the globe, gets out and locks the door. However, the police are waiting to apprehend him, and Chan and the rest emerge unscathed (the trap had been found during an inspection and rendered harmless). Fenton cannot be Narvo, as the latter is known to be a younger man. He refuses to identify his leader. When Chan asks for a glass of water for Fenton, Jeffrey gets it for him, falling into Chan's trap. The detective samples the water and identifies the same poison that was found in Kirby's brandy.

Cast
 Sidney Toler as Charlie Chan
 Marjorie Weaver as Patricia West
 Robert Lowery as David Elliot
 Ricardo Cortez as George Kirby
 Donald MacBride as Inspector Vance
 Melville Cooper as Herbert Fenton
 Joan Valerie as June Preston
 Kane Richmond as Ralph Percy
 Sen Yung as Jimmy Chan
 John Sutton as Richard Jeffery (called Keith Jeffery by Kirby)
 Leyland Hodgson as Robert Boggs
 Clarence Muse as Butler
 Frederick Worlock as Hugh Drake
 Lal Chand Mehra as Ramullah
 Shemp Howard as Fakir (uncredited)

References

Bibliography
 Backer, Ron. Mystery Movie Series of 1930s Hollywood. McFarland, 2012.

External links

American black-and-white films
1940 crime films
1940 mystery films
1940 films
Charlie Chan films
Films directed by Harry Lachman
Films set in New York (state)
20th Century Fox films
American aviation films
American crime films
American mystery films
1940s American films
1940s English-language films